Vagts is a surname. Notable people with the surname include:

Alfred Vagts (1892–1986), German poet and historian
Detlev F. Vagts (1929–2013), American legal scholar
Erich Vagts (1896–1980), German politician